Perrey is a surname. Notable people with the surname include:
 Alexis Perrey (1807–1882), French seismologist
 Mireille Perrey  (1904–1991), French actress
 Nathalie Perrey (1929–2012), French actress
 Jean-Jacques Perrey (1929–2016), French electronic music producer

See also
Perrey Reeves (born 1970), American actress